The Fort Wayne General Electrics was an amateur basketball team located in Fort Wayne, Indiana and competed in the National Basketball League and the National Industrial Basketball League. They joined the NBL (who later formed the NBA) in 1937 but they stayed there for 1 year, returning to their amateur status. In 1947 they were one of the founding members of the NIBL competing there for one season.

History
The General Electrics was set up as a corporate industrial team owned by the General Electric cooperation. The goal of the team was to use the games as a means of advertising for their products, and the goal of the players was to have a steady day job while continuing their basketball careers.
In 1936, they joined the Midwest Basketball Conference (MBC) and they won their divisional playoff round by forfeit. The Electrics were scheduled to host the Dayton London Bobby's, but just hours before the game the Bobby's manager, Ray Lindemuth called Electrics manager Bill Hosket and told him the game would not be played, and when Hosket inquired as into why, Lindemuth hung up the phone. But Fort Wayne would lose the Championship series two-games-to-none to the Akron Wingfoots.
After playing in NBL for one year, having a record of 13 wins and 7 losses,  they joined the Industrial League in 1947, but they finished bottom of the table without a single win. During their NBL time, Scott Armstrong and Bart Quinn were the team's top players.

Team record

|-
|colspan="6" | Fort Wayne General Electrics
|-
|1936–37 (MBC) || 6|| 13|| .500 || 1||3
|-
|1937–38 (NBL) || 6|| 7|| .650 || ||
|-

Notable players
 Scott Armstrong
 Bart Quinn
 James Hilgemann
 Preston Slack
 Bud Lindberg
 Claude Holmes
 Byron Evard

References

 
Amateur Athletic Union
1936 establishments in Indiana
Basketball teams established in 1936
1948 disestablishments in Indiana
Sports clubs disestablished in 1948